Josie "Joe" Klugmann (March 26, 1895 – July 18, 1951), was a former professional baseball player who played second base from 1921 to 1925.

He later managed the Nashville Volunteers of the Southern Association in 1931 and 1932.

External links

1895 births
1951 deaths
Major League Baseball second basemen
Brooklyn Robins players
Chicago Cubs players
Cleveland Indians players
Baseball players from Missouri
Minor league baseball managers
Superior Brickmakers players
Atlanta Crackers players
Des Moines Boosters players
Minneapolis Millers (baseball) players
Memphis Chickasaws players
Nashville Vols managers
Nashville Vols players
Knoxville Smokies players
Quincy Indians players